The 2020 DTM Trophy was the inaugural season of the DTM support series for GT cars eligible for E2-SH and E2-SC-class FIA categories. The series will be run by ITR, the association also organising the Deutsche Tourenwagen Masters. The championship ran as part of selected DTM race weekends in 2020, commencing in Spa-Franchorchamps on 1 August and finishing on 8 November at the Hockenheimring.

Teams and drivers 
The following teams and drivers compete in the 2020 DTM Trophy. All teams compete with tyres supplied by Hankook. The entry list was revealed on 29 July 2020.

Calendar 
The race calendar follows the DTM calendar, and was therefore also altered multiple times in response to the COVID-19 pandemic.

Results and Standings

Season summary

Scoring system 
Points were awarded to the top ten classified finishers as follows:

Additionally, the top three placed drivers in qualifying also received points:

Drivers' championship

Junior standings
The junior standings is based on only race results of eligible drivers, and thus any bonus points for qualifying do not count towards the junior classification.

XP standings

Teams' championship